Shaghalu is town and union council of Zhob District in the Balochistan province of Pakistan.

References

Populated places in Zhob District
Union councils of Balochistan, Pakistan